Lucius Vipsanius was the father of the Roman politician and general Marcus Vipsanius Agrippa, the distinguished Roman woman Vipsania Polla, and another Lucius Vipsanius.

Biography
The family of Lucius Vipsanius originated in the Italian countryside and was of humble and plebeian origins. Roddaz has argued that Vipsanius was likely a first generation Roman citizen who had acquired citizenship after the end of the Social War in 87 BC.

Legacy
The Pantheon, built by the Roman Emperor Hadrian in Rome in 118, replaced a much smaller temple built by Vipsanius's son Marcus when he was Consul for the third time. The name of Lucius Vipsanius and his son are inscribed on the building.

References

External links
Livius.org

Ancient Roman equites
Roman-era inhabitants of Italy
Lucius Vipsanius
1st-century BC Romans